The Slovak ice hockey champions is a title awarded annually to the winning playoff team of the top-tier ice hockey league in Slovakia, which currently is Tipsport liga. It was first awarded to Dukla Trenčín in 1994, the championship's inaugural year. HC Slovan Bratislava holds the most titles in history with 9 titles. The most recent Slovak Champions are HC Slovan Bratislava, who won their ninth title in club history in 2022.

Previous winners

Title champions

Notes

References

See also
Tipsport liga
Ice hockey in Slovakia